Bear Grass School is a historic school complex and national historic district located at Bear Grass, Martin County, North Carolina.  The complex includes the one-story Colonial Revival style brick school (1925), a utility shed, a  frame gymnasium (1942), a brick cafeteria and high school building (1948), a brick gymnasium (1955), a brick principal's residence (1955), a frame "scout hut" (1951), and a frame teacherage (1935).

It was listed on the National Register of Historic Places in 2004.

References

School buildings on the National Register of Historic Places in North Carolina
Historic districts on the National Register of Historic Places in North Carolina
Colonial Revival architecture in North Carolina
School buildings completed in 1925
Buildings and structures in Martin County, North Carolina
National Register of Historic Places in Martin County, North Carolina
1925 establishments in North Carolina